The Vultee XP-68 Tornado was a proposed American high-altitude interceptor aircraft. It was based on the experimental XP-54 Swoose Goose and powered by the Wright R-2160 Tornado 42-cylinder radial engine driving a set of contra-rotating propellers in a twin-boom pusher configuration. When the engine was cancelled on 22 November 1941, the XP-68 was also cancelled.

Specifications

See also

References

Citations

Bibliography
 Andrade, John M. U.S. Military Aircraft Designations and Serials since 1909. Earl Shilton, Leicester, UK: Midland Counties Publications, 1979.  (Hardcover),  (Softcover).
 Angelucci, Enzo and Peter Bowers. The American Fighter, The Definite Guide to American Fighter Aircraft from 1917 to the Present. New York: Orion Books, 1987. .
 
 Thompson, Jonathan. Vultee Aircraft 1932–1947. Santa Ana, CA; Narkiewicz/Thompson, 1992. .
 Wagner, Ray. American Combat Planes of the 20th Century: A Comprehensive Reference. Reno, Nevada: Jack Bacon & Co, 2004. .

External links
 Vultee XP-68 Fact Sheet at the National Museum of the USAF
 Vultee XP-68

Cancelled military aircraft projects of the United States
Single-engined pusher aircraft
Twin-boom aircraft
Aircraft with contra-rotating propellers
XP-68